Courts of Delaware include:
;State courts of Delaware
Delaware Supreme Court
Delaware Court of Chancery
Delaware Superior Court (3 courts, one for each county)
Delaware Family Court
Delaware Court of Common Pleas
Delaware Justice of the Peace Court
Delaware Alderman's Court

Federal courts located in Delaware
United States District Court for the District of Delaware

References

External links
National Center for State Courts – directory of state court websites.

Delaware state courts
Courts in the United States